Mark Antony De Wolfe Howe (also Anthony, DeWolf, De Wolf, and DeWolfe; April 5, 1808 – July 31, 1895) was an Episcopal priest and later first Bishop of the Episcopal Diocese of Central Pennsylvania, the present day Episcopal Diocese of Bethlehem.

Early life and education
Mark Antony De Wolfe Howe was born Mark Antony De Wolf Howe on April 5, 1808, in Bristol, Rhode Island. (As an adult, he changed the spelling of his second middle name to De Wolfe.) He was the son of John and Louisa (Smith) Howe, and a descendant of James Howe, an English immigrant to Roxbury and Ipswich, Massachusetts, in 1637. Maternally, he was connected to Richard Smith, the first town clerk of Bristol, Rhode Island from the 1680s. He was also a great-grandson to Senator James De Wolf.

He attended Phillips Academy, Andover, and Middlebury College in Vermont. He left Middlebury to pursue education at Brown University, his father's alma mater. He graduated from Brown in 1828, having becoming friends with Francis Wayland, a president of Brown.

He taught Latin at Brown, as well as in the public schools of Boston. At the same time he studied law at his father's law office. Howe studied religion under John Bristed (son-in-law of John Jacob Astor and father of Charles Astor Bristed).

He was the recipient of several honorary degrees, including a LL.D. from the University of Pennsylvania in 1876.

Ordination and pastoral career
In 1832, Howe was ordained deacon by Alexander V. Griswold, bishop of the Eastern Diocese, at Saint Matthew's Episcopal Church, South Boston.

Before the end of 1832, Howe became rector of Saint James' Episcopal Church, Roxbury, Massachusetts, serving until 1846, when he was called to Saint Luke's Episcopal Church, Philadelphia, Pennsylvania, where he remained rector for 25 years.

He attended General Conventions in 1850, 1859, and 1865, helping lay the foundation for the church hymnal. He wrote Memoirs of the Life and Services of the Right Reverend Alonzo Potter, D. D., LL. D. in 1871.

That same year, Howe was elected bishop of the newly formed Diocese of Central Pennsylvania. The original Diocese of Central Pennsylvania was the predecessor diocese of the current Diocese of Bethlehem, and as a result, he is counted as first bishop of Bethlehem as well. He was the father of writer Mark Antony De Wolfe Howe. In 1891, Howe retired to his home in Bristol, Rhode Island, where he died on July 31, 1895.

Consecrators
 Benjamin Bosworth Smith, ninth presiding bishop of the Episcopal Church
 Charles Pettit McIlvaine
 Alfred Lee
Howe was the 99th bishop consecrated in the Episcopal Church.

Family

Mark Antony DeWolfe Howe married, first, Julia Bowen Amory (1804-1841) and had 5 children:
Louisa Smith Howe, October 3, 1834 – March 18, 1845
Thomas Amory Howe, March 24, 1836 – February 7, 1840
Mary Amory Howe, May 4, 1837 – January 4, 1867, married William Hobart Hare, D.D., Missionary Bishop of Niobrara. 
Helen Maria Howe, July 19, 1838 – April 4, 1839
Julia Amory Howe, April 30, 1840 – May 9, 1841

Mark Antony DeWolfe Howe married, second, Elizabeth Smith Marshall (1822-1855) and had 8 children:
Herbert Marshall Howe, July 16, 1844 – September 30, 1916
Reginald Heber Howe, April 9, 1846 – June 6, 1924  
Mark Antony DeWolfe Howe, 1848 – June 2, 1860 
Julia Amory Howe, January 31, 1850 – June 22, 1850 
Elizabeth Marshall Howe, May 12, 1851 – 1904, married George Pomeroy Allen 
Frank Perley Howe, September 19, 1853 – August 24, 1922  
Alfred Leighton Howe, April 4, 1854 – 1911
John Ernest Howe, September 22, 1855 – May 1, 1857

Mark Antony DeWolfe Howe married, third, Eliza Whitney (1826-1909), daughter of Asa Whitney, and had 5 children:
Anna Barnard Howe, May 8, 1858 – May 28, 1858
Arthur Whitney Howe, May 15, 1859 – 1953 
Antoinette DeWolf Howe, January 13, 1861 – April 3, 1862
Mark Antony DeWolfe Howe, August 28, 1864 – December 6, 1960 
Wallis Eastburn Howe, September 12, 1868 – September 15, 1960

See also

 DeWolf family
 Succession of Bishops of the Episcopal Church in the United States

Notes

References

 The Episcopal Church Annual. Morehouse Publishing: New York, NY (2005).
 Howe, M. A. DeW. Jr. The Right Rev. Mark Antony De Wolf Howe, D. D.: First Bishop of Central Pennsylvania. 1901.

Brown University alumni
1808 births
1895 deaths
People from Bristol, Rhode Island
19th-century Anglican bishops in the United States
Episcopal Church in Pennsylvania
Religious leaders from Rhode Island
DeWolf family
Episcopal bishops of Central Pennsylvania
Episcopal bishops of Bethlehem